The Netherlands women's national under-18 and under-19 basketball team is a national youth basketball team of the Netherlands, administered by Basketball Nederland.
It represents the country in international under-18 and under-19 (under age 18 and under age 19) women's basketball competitions.

FIBA U18 Women's European Championship participations

FIBA Under-19 Women's Basketball World Cup participations

See also
Netherlands women's national basketball team
Netherlands women's national under-16 basketball team
Netherlands men's national under-18 basketball team

References

Basketball
Basketball in the Netherlands
Women's national under-19 basketball teams